Norbert Hornstein is professor emeritus of linguistics at the University of Maryland. Working within a generative framework, he has worked on the nature of logical form, and has recently proposed that control should, like raising, be analyzed in terms of movement.

Hornstein graduated from McGill University in 1975 and received his Ph.D. from Harvard University in 1979. He was an assistant professor at Columbia University, and has been at the University of Maryland since 1983.

External links
 Homepage at Maryland

Syntacticians
Linguists from the United States
Jewish linguists
Living people
Year of birth missing (living people)
McGill University alumni
Harvard University alumni
University of Maryland, College Park faculty